Chililabombwe (formerly named Bancroft) is a small town in Copperbelt Province, Zambia. It is located near the Democratic Republic of the Congo border. The name Chililabombwe means 'place of the croaking frog' in the local language of Lamba. The town has a population of 87 000 based on census data from 2010, making it one of the largest towns in the Copperbelt. The town is on the T3 road, 26 km north of the neighbouring town of Chingola, and approximately 10 km south of the large border market of Kasumbalesa. It has also produced national heroes like the late soccer star Eston Mulenga and many others. It's a home for the bundu people.  

The town's main economic activity is copper mining.

Chililabombwe town also has small communities like Konkola. Konkola town is the home of Konkola Copper Mine.

Politics
The current mayor is Lucky Sichone  supported by the deputy mayor, Getrude Witola. 
The town is represented in the National Assembly by the Chililabombwe constituency and the current Member of Parliament is Paul Kabuswe.

Mining 
Chililabombwe has 16 mines. The primary mine is Konkola Copper Mines. Konkola Copper Mine is one of Africa's largest copper producers, owned by Vedanta Resources Limited. Prior to privatization efforts in 2000, the mine was owned by ZCCM, a Zambian copper mining conglomerate. The Zambian government possessed a 60,3% stake in ZCCM. Lubambe Copper Mine, formerly known as Konkola North, is a mine operated by Australian private equity firm, EMR Capital Resources.

Tourism
Chililabombwe is well known for its hospitality and many informal markets. The small mining town is also home to a number of guest lodges, such as the town's first guest lodge, the Tabernacle Guest Lodge, which began operations a decade ago. Since then, additional guest lodges such as Hillview Guest House, Skyways Guest Lodge, Dopchim Guest Lodge, and King Dezza lodge have also become well known in the Copperbelt region.

Sport
Chililabombwe is the home of the Zambian football club, Konkola Blades. The team play their home games at the Konkola Stadium in Chililabombwe, which has a seating capacity of 25,000.

See also 

 Railway stations in Zambia
 Chingola
 Kitwe
 Ndola

References 

Populated places in Copperbelt Province